Georges Charles Le Rider (27 January 1928 – 3 July 2014) was a French historian, librarian and administrator, a specialist in Greek numismatics, who headed the Bibliothèque nationale de France in Paris. He had a filial relationship with Henri Arnold Seyrig who became and remained his mentor.

Career 
After he was admitted to the École normale supérieure in 1948, Le Rider obtained his agrégation de lettres classiques in 1952. A member of the École française d'Athènes from 1952 to 1955, he joined the French Institute of Archeology of the Near East, where he stayed until 1958. While he was living in Athens, his son  was born; Jacques was to become a renowned Germanist. On his return from Beirut, Georges entered the Bibliothèque nationale de France as curator of the Cabinet des Médailles, a department he then headed from 1961.

Concurrent with his work with these several institutions, he pursued a teaching career, first at the École pratique des hautes études, then at the University of Lille and at the university Paris-IV, before being elected professor of economic and monetary history of the Hellenistic East at the College de France in 1993. He retired in 1998.

He was elected a member of the Académie des Inscriptions et Belles-Lettres in 1989. In 1996, he was elected to the American Philosophical Society.

Le Rider was made a knight of the Ordre national de la Légion d'honneur in 1977 and promoted to the level of officier (officer) on 30 January 2008. He was also an officer of the Ordre national du Mérite and commandeur (Commander) of the Ordre des Palmes Académiques.

Works 
1965: Suse sous les Séleucides et les Parthes, les trouvailles monétaires et l’histoire de la ville, (thesis)
1966: Monnaies crétoises du Ve au Ier siècle av. J.-C., (complementary thesis)
1975: Code pour l’analyse des monnaies
1977: Le monnayage d’argent et d’or de Philippe II frappé en Macédoine de 359 à 294
1983: Catalogue de la collection Delepierre entrée au Cabinet des médailles en 1966, (in collaboration with H. Nicolet)
1988: Le Trésor de Meydancikkale (Cilicie-Trachée 1980), (in collaboration with A. Davesne)
1996: Monnayages et finances de Philippe II, un état de la question,
1997: Prix du blé et numéraire dans l’Égypte lagide de 305 à 173, (in collaboration with H. Cadell)
1998: Séleucie du Tigre, les monnaies séleucides et parthes
1999: Antioche de Syrie sous les Séleucides : corpus des monnaies d’or et d’argent. I, De Séleucos à Antiochos V, c. 300-161
2001: La naissance de la monnaie : pratiques monétaires de l'Orient ancien, Paris, PUF, series "Histoires".
2003: Alexandre Le Grand : monnaie, finances et politique
2006: Les Séleucides et les Ptolémées : l'héritage monétaire et financier d'Alexandre le Grand, (in collaboration with François de Callataÿ).

References

External links 
 Hommage à Georges Le Rider (1928-2014) La Lettre du Collège de France
 Hommage on ''La Lettre du Collège de France
 Hommage à Georges Le Rider on Société française de numismatique
 Georges Le Rider on Radioscopie (3 January 1979)
 Publications on CAIRN

20th-century French historians
French librarians
École Normale Supérieure alumni
Academic staff of the Collège de France
Academic staff of the University of Lille Nord de France
Academic staff of the École pratique des hautes études
Officers of the Ordre national du Mérite
Commandeurs of the Ordre des Palmes Académiques
Officiers of the Légion d'honneur
Members of the Académie des Inscriptions et Belles-Lettres
1928 births 
People from Finistère
2014 deaths
Members of the American Philosophical Society